Christian Gollong (1901–1988) was a German stage and film actor. He appeared in four films in major roles, all of them in 1939.

Selected filmography
 In the Name of the People (1939)
 Kitty and the World Conference (1939)
  (1939)

References

Bibliography
 Wolfgang Jacobsen & Hans Helmut Prinzler. Käutner. Spiess, 1992.

External links

 
 

1901 births
1988 deaths
German male film actors
German male stage actors
Actors from Frankfurt